Kamenka is a rural locality (a selo) in Kovalyovskoye Rural Settlement, Oktyabrsky District, Volgograd Oblast, Russia. The population was 129 as of 2010. There are 3 streets.

Geography 
The village is located in steppe, on Yergeni, 150 km from Volgograd, 23 km from Oktyabrsky, 9 km from Zhutovo-1.

References 

Rural localities in Oktyabrsky District, Volgograd Oblast